The 1981-82 NBA season was the Bulls' 16th season in the NBA.

Draft picks

Roster

Regular season

Season standings

z - clinched division title
y - clinched division title
x - clinched playoff spot

Record vs. opponents

Game log

Player statistics

Season

Awards and records
 Artis Gilmore, NBA All-Star Game

Transactions

References

See also
 1981-82 NBA season

Chicago Bulls seasons
Ch
Chicago Bulls
Chicago Bulls